Ismael "Bandolero" Leonardo Durán Galfano (8 April 1949 - 5 October 2021) was a Chilean singer-songwriter and political activist. He gained fame during the 80's, when he made various collaborations with the armed resistance in Chile during the military dictatorship.

Biography 
Ismael Durán was born on the 8th of April 1949 to Ada Adela Galfano Portales and Darío Durán Domínguez, in Punta Arenas, Chile.

In 1973, after the military coup in Chile, he immigrated to Argentina, and, later on France, where he met his partner, Mary Clare Carolan. That's where he has the majority of his musical career, becoming a singer of the Nueva Canción Chilena.

After this, he moved to Detroit, an American city with a substantial Latin American population, where he had two children: Vicente Durán,who would go on to become a rapper, using the artistic name of SubVerso, and Amelia Durán, who, with her father, helped establish Garage Cultural, a cultural center dedicated to preserving Latin American culture in the United States.

In 1984, he came back to Chile in order to play next to other Chilean artists. In 1985, he wrote the song "El paro lo agito yo" (lit: I stop the strike) along with Ana María Miranda in the album Movimiento Democrático Popular, which was published by the organization of the same name. In 1999, he collaborated in the album Con Vista a la Esperanza, which was  published in honor of Miguel Enríquez, by writing and recording the song "Por ti Juventud", (lit. For you, youth) which is a song calling out for unity between the Manuel Rodríguez Patriotic Front and the Revolutionary Left Movement.

As time went on, he returned to Detroit, where he resided for many years. He was also invited to the Cuban dance festival Cubadisco on various occasions, including the 2009, 2010, 2011, 2012, 2014, 2016, 2017, and 2019 editions.

He published two albums, Memorias de la dignidad and Antología.

References

External links 
 Ismael Durán on Facebook
 Ismael Durán on Twitter

1949 births
Chilean songwriters
Chilean emigrants to the United States
20th-century Chilean male singers
Living people
People from Punta Arenas
21st-century Chilean male singers
20th-century Chilean male artists